The Multinational Division Central MND (C), was a multi-national division in NATO for Central Europe and had its headquarters at the British base in JHQ Rheindahlen near Mönchengladbach.

The concept for this first genuine multi-national division in NATO with its four participating nations - Belgium, Germany, the United Kingdom and the Netherlands originated during the Cold War. The airmobile MND (C) was to support Northern Army Group Central Europe (NORTHAG) as a reserve formation. The  MND (C) achieved operational readiness on 1 April 1994. The divisional staff comprised 50 officers, 54 NCOs and soldiers. The headquarters company initially had 154 soldiers from Germany. Its first commander was Major General Pieter Huysman from the Netherlands.

On the full activation of the division each nation was to make available a parachute or airmobile brigade, combat support units and supply units.

Four brigades from the participating nations were under command:
 the Belgian Para-Commando Brigade (Eversberg)
 the German 31 Airmobile Brigade (Oldenburg)
 the British 24th Airmobile Brigade (Colchester), from 1999: the 16 Air Assault Brigade and
 the Dutch 11 Luchtmobiele Brigade (Schaarsbergen)

MND-C, with a theoretical strength of 20,000 soldiers, was the most important of the multi-national rapid reaction forces stationed in Europe and had the capability of deploying on worldwide military intervention missions. The Division would be placed under command of its superior formation, Allied Rapid Reaction Corps (ARRC), on request.

As part of the Forces Answerable to WEU (FAWEU) it was also possible for the MND(C) to be mobilised for military operations under the Western European Union (WEU).

Because NATO became increasingly focussed on other crisis reaction forces (the so-called High Readiness Forces (Land)), the headquarters of MND (C) was disbanded on 25 October 2002. Its last commander was Major General Marc Jacqmin.

External links 
Report of the disbandment

Military units and formations of NATO
Airborne divisions
Divisions of the Bundeswehr
British Army divisions
Military units and formations of Belgium
Military units and formations of the Netherlands
Military units and formations established in 1994
Military units and formations disestablished in 2002